Euriphene goniogramma, the littlest nymph, is a butterfly in the family Nymphalidae. It is found in Nigeria, Cameroon and the Democratic Republic of the Congo (from the north to Ubangi, Mongala, Uele, Ituri and northern Kivu). The habitat consists of forests.

The larvae feed on Combretum species

References

Butterflies described in 1894
Euriphene
Butterflies of Africa